Fareghan (also Romanized as Fāreghān, Faraghān, and Fārghān; also known as Faraqān) is a city and capital of Fareghan District, in Hajjiabad County, Hormozgan Province, Iran. At the 2006 census, its population was 1,862, in 491 families.

References 

Populated places in Hajjiabad County
Cities in Hormozgan Province